Rybne may refer to the following places in Europe:

Rybne, Podkarpackie Voivodeship in Poland
Rybne, Masovian Voivodeship in Poland
Rybne, a village in Ivano-Frankivsk Raion, Ivano-Frankivsk Oblast, Ukraine